Sir Kenneth Percy Bloomfield, KCB (born 15 April 1931), is a former Head of the Northern Ireland Civil Service (NICS) who was later a member of the Independent Commission for the Location of Victims' Remains and, for a time, Northern Ireland Victims Commissioner. In addition to this, he has held a variety of public sector posts in Northern Ireland and elsewhere.

Early and personal life
Ken Bloomfield was born in Belfast, Northern Ireland, to English parents in 1931. He grew up close to Neill's Hill railway station, East Belfast.  Between the years of 1943 and 1949, he attended the Royal Belfast Academical Institution ('Inst') and later went on to read Modern History at St Peter's College, Oxford. He is married with two children. On 12 September 1988, he and his wife were the targets of an IRA attack on their home in Crawfordsburn, County Down; neither Bloomfield nor his wife were injured in the blast.

Public sector career
Having joined the Civil Service in 1952, Bloomfield was appointed Permanent Secretary to the power sharing executive in 1974. After the collapse of the executive, he went on to become Permanent Secretary for the Department of the Environment (D.o.E.) and the Department of Economic Development, and finally Head of the Northern Ireland Civil Service on 1 December 1984. In that capacity, he was the most senior advisor to successive Secretaries of State for Northern Ireland and other Ministers on a wide range of issues. He retired from the post in April 1991.

Since retiring from the NICS, Bloomfield has embarked on a life of involvement in a diverse range of organisations. He has taken up roles such as Chairman for the Northern Ireland Legal Services Commission and his alma mater, the Royal Belfast Academical Institution. He has also been involved in the political reform of the States of Jersey and spearheaded the Association for Quality Education, which fought to retain academic selection in the Northern Ireland education system. In December 1997 he was asked by the then Secretary of State for Northern Ireland, Mo Mowlam, to become the Northern Ireland Victims Commissioner for a fixed term. His role was to produce a report on the way forward for Victims issues in Northern Ireland. His report entitled We Will Remember Them was published in April 1998. From 1991 to 1999 he served as the BBC's National Governor for Northern Ireland.

Honours
Bloomfield received a Knighthood in the 1987 Queen's Birthday Honours and has received honorary doctorates from The Queen's University of Belfast, The Open University and the University of Ulster. He is also a Member of the Royal Irish Academy (RIA).

Works
 A New Life (2008)
 A Tragedy of Errors (2007) 
 We will remember them (1998)
 Stormont in Crisis, a memoir (1994)
 "The BBC at the Watershed" (2008)

See also
Northern Ireland Civil Service
Royal Belfast Academical Institution

References

External links
Independent Commission for the Location of Victims Remains Official Website

Living people
1931 births
Civil servants from Northern Ireland
Knights Commander of the Order of the Bath
Alumni of St Peter's College, Oxford
BBC people
Honorary Fellows of St Peter's College, Oxford
People educated at the Royal Belfast Academical Institution
Members of the Royal Irish Academy
People of The Troubles (Northern Ireland)
Heads of the Northern Ireland Civil Service